Are You Afraid of the Dark? is a Canadian-American television series that originally aired from 1991 to 1996. It premiered with the episode "The Tale of the Twisted Claw" as a pilot on October 31, 1990, on the Canadian television network YTV. The pilot aired on Nickelodeon on October 25, 1991, as a Halloween special. The series premiered the following year on Nickelodeon's SNICK on August 15, 1992, and on Family Channel on September 2, 1992. The series moved from Family Channel to YTV on September 6, 1993. The original series ended on April 20, 1996.

A revival series consisting of two seasons ran from 1999 to 2000 on Nickelodeon and the Family Channel. In February 2019, it was announced that the series would be revived again for a limited series, which premiered on October 11, 2019. In February 2020, this revival was renewed for a second season, subtitled Curse of the Shadows, which premiered on February 12, 2021, featuring a different cast. In March 2022, the revival was renewed for a third season, subtitled Ghost Island, which premiered on July 30, 2022.

Series overview

Original series episodes

Season 1 (1992)

Season 2 (1993)

Season 3 (1994)

Season 4 (1994–95)

Season 5 (1995–96)

First revival series episodes

Season 6 (1999)

Season 7 (2000)

Second revival series episodes

Carnival of Doom (2019)

Curse of the Shadows (2021)

Ghost Island (2022)

References

External links
 
  (original series)
  (first revival series)
  (second revival series)

Are You Afraid of the Dark?
Lists of American children's television series episodes
Lists of Canadian children's television series episodes
Lists of Nickelodeon television series episodes